The Battle of Civetot in 1096 brought an end to the People's Crusade, before Princes' Crusade.

Background 
After the disastrous defeat for the Crusaders in the siege of Xerigordos, two Turkish spies spread a rumor that the German element of the People's Crusade, which had taken Xerigordon, had also taken Nicaea. This had the effect of causing excitement among the main camp of Crusaders to share in the looting of the city as soon as possible. The Turks were waiting on the road to Nicaea. Peter the Hermit, the nominal leader of the crusade, had gone back to Constantinople to arrange for supplies and was due back soon, and most of the leaders argued to wait for him to return (which he never did). However, Geoffrey Burel, who had taken command, argued that it would be cowardly to wait, and they should move against the Turks right away. His will prevailed and, on the morning of October 21, the entire army of over 20,000 marched out toward Nicaea, leaving women, children, the old and the sick behind at the camp.

Battle and aftermath
Three miles from the camp, where the road entered a narrow, wooded valley near the village of Dracon, the Turkish army of Kilij Arslan I was waiting. When approaching the valley, the Crusaders marched noisily and were immediately subjected to a hail of arrows. Panic set in immediately and within minutes, the army was in full rout back to the camp. Most of the Crusaders were slaughtered (upwards of 60,000 by some accounts); however, women, children, and those who surrendered were spared. One of the leaders of the crusade, the knight Walter Sans Avoir, was killed in the thick of the action. Three thousand, including Geoffrey Burel, were able to obtain refuge in an abandoned castle. Eventually, the Byzantines under Constantine Katakalon sailed over and raised the siege; these few thousand returned to Constantinople, the only survivors of the People's Crusade.

References 

Civetot
Civetot
1096 in Asia
1090s in the Byzantine Empire
Civetot